Bollani is an Italian surname. Notable people with the surname include:

 Domenico Bollani (1514–1579), Venetian politician
 Stefano Bollani (born 1972), Italian musician

See also
 Bollano

Surnames of Italian origin